The Ōtara-Papatoetoe Local Board is one of the 21 local boards of the Auckland Council. It is overseen by the Manukau ward councillors.

The local board area includes the suburbs of Ōtara, Papatoetoe, East Tāmaki, Puhinui and central Manukau.

Demographics

Ōtara-Papatoetoe Local Board Area had a population of 85,122 at the 2018 New Zealand census, an increase of 9,459 people (12.5%) since the 2013 census, and an increase of 12,798 people (17.7%) since the 2006 census. There were 20,412 households, comprising 42,900 males and 42,225 females, giving a sex ratio of 1.02 males per female. The median age was 29.1 years (compared with 37.4 years nationally), with 20,610 people (24.2%) aged under 15 years, 23,328 (27.4%) aged 15 to 29, 34,233 (40.2%) aged 30 to 64, and 6,951 (8.2%) aged 65 or older.

Ethnicities were 16.6% European/Pākehā, 15.7% Māori, 46.0% Pacific peoples, 35.1% Asian, and 1.6% other ethnicities. People may identify with more than one ethnicity.

The percentage of people born overseas was 45.7, compared with 27.1% nationally.

Although some people chose not to answer the census's question about religious affiliation, 18.2% had no religion, 48.5% were Christian, 1.6% had Māori religious beliefs, 12.0% were Hindu, 4.7% were Muslim, 2.0% were Buddhist and 7.8% had other religions.

Of those at least 15 years old, 8,895 (13.8%) people had a bachelor's or higher degree, and 13,035 (20.2%) people had no formal qualifications. The median income was $25,900, compared with $31,800 nationally. 4,560 people (7.1%) earned over $70,000 compared to 17.2% nationally. The employment status of those at least 15 was that 32,469 (50.3%) people were employed full-time, 7,608 (11.8%) were part-time, and 3,735 (5.8%) were unemployed.

2022–2025 term
The current board members, elected at the 2022 local body elections, are:
Apulu Reece Autagavaia, Labour – (3662 votes)
Ofa Dewes, Labour – (3267 votes)
Albert Lim, INDEPENDENTLY PAPATOETOE – (3142 votes)
Vi Hausia, Labour – (3117 votes)
Swanie Nelson, Labour – (3106 votes)
Ashraf Choudhary, Labour – (3079 votes)
Topou Folau, (no affiliation) – (2152 votes)

2019–2022 term
Board members, elected at the 2019 local body elections, are:
Ross Robertson, Labour – (5443 votes)
Dawn Trenberth, Labour – (4116 votes)
Ofa Dewes, Labour – (3913 votes)
Lotu Fuli, Labour – (3848 votes)
Ashraf Choudhary, Labour – (3785 votes)
Swanie Nelson, Labour – (3687 votes)
Apulu Reece Autagavaia, Labour – (3613 votes)

2016–2019 term
The board members who served from the 2016 local body elections to the 2019 election were:
 Lotu Fuli (Chair)
 Ross Robertson (Deputy Chair)
 Apulu Reece Autagavaia
 Mary Gush
 Donna Lee
 Dawn Trenberth
 Ashraf Choudhary

References

Local boards of the Auckland Region